Soham is an unincorporated community and census-designated place in San Miguel County, New Mexico, United States. Its population was 210 as of the 2010 census. The community is located near Exit 319 on Interstate 25.

Geography

Demographics

Education
It is within Pecos Independent Schools.

References

Census-designated places in New Mexico
Census-designated places in San Miguel County, New Mexico